The DeWitt Post Office in DeWitt, Arkansas is a historic post office building at 221 West Cross Street.  It is a modest single-story brick and masonry structure with a hip roof, built in 1939 in a restrained Colonial Revival style.  It is basically rectangular structure, with a loading dock area projecting from the center of the rear.  The building is notable for the murals in its lobby area, painted by William Traher of Denver, Colorado, and paid for with funds from the United States Treasury Department's Section of Fine Arts, a Depression-era project to support artists.

The building was listed on the National Register of Historic Places in 1998.

See also 

National Register of Historic Places listings in Arkansas County, Arkansas
List of United States post offices

References 

Post office buildings on the National Register of Historic Places in Arkansas
Colonial Revival architecture in Arkansas
Government buildings completed in 1939
National Register of Historic Places in Arkansas County, Arkansas
1939 establishments in Arkansas